Sinotympana is an Asian genus of cicadas in the tribe Dundubiini.

Species 
The following are included:
 Sinotympana incomparabilis Lee, 2009 – type species – southern China
 Sinotympana caobangensis Pham, Sanbourn, Nguyen, Constant, 2019 - Vietnam

References

External links 

Auchenorrhyncha genera
Hemiptera of Asia
Dundubiini